Jean-Marc Chanelet (born 23 July 1968 in Paris) is a French former professional footballer who played as a defender.

Honours
Nantes
 Coupe de France: 1998–99, 1999–2000
 Trophée des Champions: 1999

Lyon
 Ligue 1: 2001–02, 2002–03
 Coupe de la Ligue: 2000-01
 Trophée des Champions: 2002

References

External links
 
 
 

Living people
1968 births
Association football defenders
French footballers
FC Istres players
Nîmes Olympique players
FC Nantes players
Olympique Lyonnais players
Grenoble Foot 38 players
Ligue 1 players
Ligue 2 players